Salehabad (also Romanized as Şāleḩābād) is a city in and the capital of Salehabad District, in Mehran County, Ilam Province, Iran. At the 2006 census, its population was 1,934, in 399 families. The village is populated by Kurds.

References

Populated places in Mehran County

Cities in Ilam Province
Kurdish settlements in Ilam Province